The Band Perry is the debut album by the American country music group of the same name. The album includes five songs from the band's digital EP The Band Perry EP, which was released in April 2010. The album produced five singles: "Hip to My Heart", "If I Die Young", "You Lie", "All Your Life", and "Postcard from Paris". Of these, "If I Die Young" and "All Your Life" were number one hits on the Billboard Hot Country Songs chart.

Critical reception

Thom Jurek of Allmusic gave the album a three-star rating out of five, saying that the album was "carefully crafted" and thought that the singles were among the strongest tracks on it. Country Weekly reviewer Jessica Phillips said that the album was "more introspective and engrossing than typical radio fare", and praised Kimberly's "unpolished" voice, but thought that some songs had "aimless" lyrics. She also gave it three stars out of five. Also giving it a positive review, Michael McCall of the Associated Press compared the band favorably to Taylor Swift and Lady Antebellum, and said that the album's "emphasis is on easygoing, back-porch music." BBC Music's Sid Smith cautioned that "whilst there’s no faulting the tightly-drilled performances turned in by the trio and an array of skilled sessioneers, the delivery has a by-the-numbers feel that’s workman-like rather than inspired", yet he reasoned that "perhaps the fault lies with a set of committee-written tunes that are well-worn and overly-familiar." Lastly, Smith said that with respect to this album its "blandness becomes difficult to ignore".

At Entertainment Weekly, Leah Greenblatt found that the listener needs to "think of them as a more modest, homegrown Lady Antebellum" that comes "with twangier roots and dustier boots." However, Maddy Costa at The Guardian evoked how "their country-rock sound has been lacquered to a high gloss, burying Neil Perry's mandolin and Stuart Duncan's fiddle beneath slick guitar, domineering pop rhythms and sickly strings. Frontwoman Kimberley Perry has a belter of a voice, but it's too clean to communicate real emotion." Costa found only one good track, which was "Double Heart" that she suggested what the "band could be", and the song has "one part sleazy rock'n'roll, two parts country sass and snarl, it has more personality than the rest of the album put together." Roughstock's Bobby Peacock did not agree with Costa, when he wrote that this is a "surprisingly diverse debut album", and this is done with Kimberly voice that is "matched perfectly to an uncluttered, mostly acoustic production that's clean without being slick." Furthermore, Peacock argued that Kimberly as being the featured songwriter "has a solid command of the language, she sometimes falls into a Clint Black-esque trap of getting so wrapped up in the turns of phrase that the storyline gets a little ensnarled; however, even when these pitfalls occur, the songwriting is still quite impressive." Lastly, Peacock told that "the songs are vaguely reminiscent of Taylor Swift's exuberance, lyrical detail and boy-craziness, not to mention her way with a catchy melody."

Commercial performance
The album debuted at number 4 on the US Billboard 200 chart upon its release, selling 53,000 copies in its first week. It was eventually certified platinum by the Recording Industry Association of America (RIAA) for sales of over a million copies in the United States. As of May 2013, the album has sold 1,505,000 copies in the US.

Track listing

Personnel
The Band Perry
 Kimberly Perry – lead vocals; acoustic guitar (2)
 Neil Perry – backing vocals; mandolin (2, 4, 7, 9 10)
 Reid Perry – backing vocals; bass (2, 4, 7, 9, 10)

Additional musicians

 Pat Buchanan – electric guitar (1, 5, 6, 11); papoose (3)
 Chris Chaney – bass guitar (8)
 Nathan Chapman – acoustic guitar, electric guitar, banjo, piccolo, percussion (2)
 Chad Cromwell – drums (1, 3, 5, 6, 11)
 Dorian Crozier – drums (8)
 Eric Darken – percussion (4, 7, 9, 10)
 Dan Dugmore – pedal steel guitar (1, 3, 5, 6, 11)
 Stuart Duncan – fiddle (1, 3, 6, 7, 8, 9, 11)
 Shannon Forrest – drums (2, 4, 7, 9, 10)
 Paul Franklin – pedal steel guitar (8)
 Rok Golob – string conductor (8)
 Rob Hajacos – fiddle (2)
 Wes Hightower – additional vocals (1, 3)
 Mike Johnson – pedal steel guitar (4, 7, 9, 10)
 Tim Lauer – piano (1, 5, 11); Hammond B-3 organ (1, 3, 5, 6, 11); accordion (3, 6)
 Tim Pierce – electric guitar (8)
 Michael Rhodes – bass guitar (1, 3, 5, 6, 11)
 Rokulus Strings – strings (8)
 Matt Serletic – cimbalom, piano, Hammond B-3 organ, accordion, programming (8)
 Tomaz Stular – contrabass (8)
 Bryan Sutton – acoustic guitar (1, 4, 5, 6, 7, 9, 10, 11); banjo (3, 4)
 Ilya Toshinsky – electric guitar (4, 7, 9); acoustic guitar, mandolin (8); 12-string acoustic guitar (8, 10)
 Biff Watson – acoustic guitar (1, 3, 5, 6, 11)
 Paul Worley – electric guitar (5, 11)

Charts

Weekly charts

Year-end charts

Decade-end charts

Singles

Notes
A^ "Hip to My Heart" did not enter the Billboard Hot 100 but peaked on the Bubbling Under Hot 100 Singles chart at number one.

Certifications

References

2010 debut albums
The Band Perry albums
Republic Records albums
Albums produced by Paul Worley
Albums produced by Nathan Chapman (record producer)